Justice Hinman may refer to:

George E. Hinman, associate justice of the Connecticut Supreme Court of Errors
Joel Hinman, associate justice and chief justice of the Connecticut Supreme Court